Coby or Koby is a male and female given name, a surname, or a nickname originating from the name "Jacob or Jakob".

Notable people with the name "Coby" include

A
Koby Abberton (born 1979), Australian surfer
Koby Altman (born 1982), American basketball executive
Koby Arthur (born 1996), Ghanaian footballer

B
Coby Bell (born 1975), American actor and producer
Coby G. Brooks (born 1969), American businessman
Coby Bryant (born 1999), American football player

C
Coby Carrozza (born 2001), American swimmer
Koby Clemens (born 1986), American baseball player
Coby Connell (born 1984), Australian actress
Coby Cotton (born 1987), American media personality

D
Coby Dietrick (born 1948), American basketball player

F
Coby Fleener (born 1988), American football player

H
Koby Holland (born 1974), American sports shooter

I
Koby Israelite (born 1966), Israeli musician
Coby Iwaasa (born 1996), Canadian racquetball player

J
Coby Jones (born 2003), American soccer player

K
Coby Karl (born 1983), American basketball player
Koby Arthur Koomson (born 1951), Ghanaian diplomat

L
Koby Lion (born 1976), Israeli paracyclist

M
Koby Maxwell (born 1978), Ghanaian musician
Coby Miller (born 1976), American track and field athlete

O
Koby Osei-Wusu (born 1995), Ghanaian-American soccer player

R
Coby Rhinehart (born 1977), American football player
Coby Rowe (born 1995), English footballer

S
Coby Sey, British musician
Coby Sikkens (born 1946), Dutch swimmer
Koby Stevens (born 1991), Australian rules footballer

V
Coby van Baalen (born 1957), Dutch equestrian

W
Coby White (born 2000), American basketball player
Coby Whitmore (1913–1988), American painter

Surname
Doug Coby (born 1979), American racing driver
Fred Coby (1916–1970), American actor
George Coby (1883–1967), Georgian businessman
Jeff Coby (born 1994), Haitian-American basketball player
Rudy Coby (born 1964), American magician

See also
Cobe (disambiguation), a disambiguation page for "Cobe"
Cobie, a page for the given name "Cobie"
Cobi (disambiguation), a disambiguation page for "Cobi"
Jacob (given name), a page for the given name "Jacob"
Kobe (given name), a page for the given name "Kobe"
Kobe (surname), a page for the surname "Kobe"
Kobi (given name), a page for the given name "Kobi"

English unisex given names